Silvanolomus denticollis, is a species of silvan flat bark beetle native to India (West Bengal, Bihar, Madhya Pradesh and Tamil ladu), Sri Lanka, Sumatra and Borneo.

Description
Average length is about 1.61 to 1.94 mm. The body is elongated, and slightly depressed. There are six large teeth on lateral side of prothorax. Dorsum is blackish or yellowish brown which is covered with short, semi-erect, golden pubescence. Eyes are large with short temple. Puncturation on vertex is coarse and dense. Antenna long and slender with large scape. Prothorax convex and slightly wider. Scutellum slightly large, transverse and pubescent. Elytra long as broad, with wavy lateral margins.

References 

Silvanidae
Insects of Sri Lanka
Insects of India
Insects described in 1876